Anette Fredriksson (3 June 1960 – 30 July 2008) was a Swedish breaststroke swimmer. She competed in three events at the 1976 Summer Olympics.

References

External links
 

1960 births
2008 deaths
Swedish female breaststroke swimmers
Olympic swimmers of Sweden
Swimmers at the 1976 Summer Olympics
Sportspeople from Karlstad
20th-century Swedish women